Shane Heard (born 28 July 1958) is a former Australian rules footballer who played with Essendon in the VFL/AFL.   He was recruited from the Horsham District League Club, Homers Football Club.

Heard started his career in 1977 and developed into a high quality tagger. He was a member of Essendon's 1984 VFL Premiership team, playing the Grand Final on the wing tagging Robert DiPierdomenico. He retired at the end of the 1987 season but was lured back to the club in 1991 for one final year.

External links

1958 births
Living people
Essendon Football Club players
Essendon Football Club Premiership players
Australian rules footballers from Victoria (Australia)
One-time VFL/AFL Premiership players